Top Chef: Kentucky is the sixteenth season of the American reality television series Top Chef. Initial details about the season and its cast were revealed on October 18, 2018. The competition was filmed at various locations in Kentucky, including Louisville, Lexington, and Lake Cumberland. The season finale took place in Macau, China. Padma Lakshmi returned as host, with Tom Colicchio, Graham Elliot, and Nilou Motamed forming the judging panel. Due to being on maternity leave for the majority of filming, Top Chef regular Gail Simmons did not appear as one of the main judges for the season. Top Chef: Kentucky premiered on December 6, 2018, and concluded on March 14, 2019. In the season finale, Kelsey Barnard Clark was declared the winner over runner-up Sara Bradley. Barnard Clark was also voted Fan Favorite.

Contestants
Fifteen chefs were selected to compete in Top Chef: Kentucky. In addition, like the previous season, three returning competitors competed in the Last Chance Kitchen to earn the chance to join the competition: Top Chef: Colorado contestants Carrie Baird and Brother Luck, and Top Chef: Charleston contestant Jim Smith. Following the sixth episode of Last Chance Kitchen, Luck was selected to join the main cast.

New contestants

Eric Adjepong and Nini Nguyen returned to compete in Top Chef: All-Stars L.A. Sara Bradley returned for Top Chef: World All-Stars.

Returning contestants

Contestant progress

: The chef(s) did not receive immunity for winning the Quickfire Challenge.
: Following Episode 6 of Last Chance Kitchen, Brother was introduced as a regular competitor.
: Despite Justin making one of the judge's favourite dishes, he did not plate a sufficient number of dishes and was thus ineligible to win.
: As a reward for winning the Quickfire Challenge, Eddie did not have to compete in the Elimination Challenge.
: Michelle won Last Chance Kitchen and returned to the competition.
 (WINNER) The chef won the season and was crowned "Top Chef".
 (RUNNER-UP) The chef was the runner-up for the season.
 (WIN) The chef won the Elimination Challenge.
 (HIGH) The chef was selected as one of the top entries in the Elimination Challenge, but did not win.
 (IN) The chef was not selected as one of the top or bottom entries in the Elimination Challenge and was safe.
 (LOW) The chef was selected as one of the bottom entries in the Elimination Challenge, but was not eliminated.
 (OUT) The chef lost the Elimination Challenge.

Episodes

Last Chance Kitchen

References
Notes

Footnotes

External links
 Official website

Top Chef
2018 American television seasons
2019 American television seasons
Television shows set in Kentucky
Television shows filmed in Kentucky
Television shows filmed in Tennessee
Television shows filmed in Macau